The canton of Soissons-2 (before 2015: Soissons-Sud) is an administrative division in northern France. It consists of the southern part of the town of Soissons and its southern suburbs. At the French canton reorganisation which came into effect in March 2015, the canton was expanded from 11 to 14 communes. Since the merger, on 1 January 2023, of Berzy-le-Sec and Noyant-et-Aconin into Bernoy-le-Château the canton has had 13 communes.
Acy
Belleu
Bernoy-le-Château
Billy-sur-Aisne
Courmelles
Mercin-et-Vaux
Missy-aux-Bois
Ploisy
Septmonts
Serches
Sermoise
Soissons (partly)
Vauxbuin

Demographics

See also
Cantons of the Aisne department 
Communes of France

References

Cantons of Aisne